Campomanesia espiritosantensis is a species of plant in the family Myrtaceae. The plant is endemic to southeastern Brazil, including in the Atlantic Forest ecoregion.

References

espiritosantensis
Endemic flora of Brazil
Flora of the Atlantic Forest
Flora of Espírito Santo
Vulnerable flora of South America
Taxonomy articles created by Polbot